Cantharis pallida is a species of soldier beetles native to Europe.

References

Cantharidae
Beetles described in 1777
Beetles of Europe